Hunan'ao Township is a rural township in You County, Zhuzhou City, Hunan Province, People's Republic of China.

Cityscape
The township is divided into 11 villages: Dukou Village, Tianxin Village, Daxing Village, Darui Village, Paishan Village, Longtian Village, Xiawan Village, Shuangtian Village, Daxiang Village, Zili Village, and Jinshui Village (杜口村、田心村、大兴村、大瑞村、排山村、龙田村、下湾村、双田村、大祥村、自力村、金水村).

References

Historic township-level divisions of You County